Children's Park may refer to:

 Children's Park (film), a 2019 Indian Malayalam film
 Children's Park, Kollam, Kerala, India
 Children's Park (San Diego), California, United States